In Greek mythology, Issa (/ˈiːsɑː/; Ancient Greek: Ἴσσα) or Isse may refer to two women:

 Isse, daughter of Macareus and Canace, children of Aeolus, and a lover of Apollo. She was usually called Amphissa.
 Issa, the eponymous nymph of Issa (Lesbos). She became the mother of the prophet Prylis by Hermes. This son predicted to the Greeks that they would take Troy by means of the Wooden Horse. She may be the daughter of King Macar and thus, sister of Methymna, Mytilene, Agamede, Antissa, Arisbe, Cydrolaus, Neandrus, Leucippus and Eresus.

Notes

References 

 Diodorus Siculus, The Library of History translated by Charles Henry Oldfather. Twelve volumes. Loeb Classical Library. Cambridge, Massachusetts: Harvard University Press; London: William Heinemann, Ltd. 1989. Vol. 3. Books 4.59–8. Online version at Bill Thayer's Web Site
Diodorus Siculus, Bibliotheca Historica. Vol 1-2. Immanel Bekker. Ludwig Dindorf. Friedrich Vogel. in aedibus B. G. Teubneri. Leipzig. 1888–1890. Greek text available at the Perseus Digital Library.
Pausanias, Description of Greece with an English Translation by W.H.S. Jones, Litt.D., and H.A. Ormerod, M.A., in 4 Volumes. Cambridge, MA, Harvard University Press; London, William Heinemann Ltd. 1918. . Online version at the Perseus Digital Library
 Pausanias, Graeciae Descriptio. 3 vols. Leipzig, Teubner. 1903.  Greek text available at the Perseus Digital Library.
 Publius Ovidius Naso, Metamorphoses translated by Brookes More (1859-1942). Boston, Cornhill Publishing Co. 1922. Online version at the Perseus Digital Library.
 Publius Ovidius Naso, Metamorphoses. Hugo Magnus. Gotha (Germany). Friedr. Andr. Perthes. 1892. Latin text available at the Perseus Digital Library.

Nymphs
Women of Apollo
Women of Hermes